Stephen Bainbridge (born 1958, in Doylestown, Pennsylvania) is the William D. Warren Professor of Law at UCLA, teaching courses on corporations and business law.  Bainbridge graduated with an A.B. Western Maryland College, 1980; a Master of Science in Chemistry, University of Virginia, 1983; and a Juris Doctor from the University of Virginia, 1985.  Bainbridge has been a law professor at UCLA since 1997.

Bainbridge has written numerous law review articles and books, with a strong emphasis on the law and economics of public corporations. He is a leading advocate of Director Primacy in corporate governance, and has written numerous law review articles on the subject.

In 2008, Bainbridge received the UCLA School of Law's Rutter Award for Excellence in Teaching. In 2008, Directorship Magazine named Bainbridge one of the 100 most influential people in the field of corporate governance.

Bainbridge created and operates ProfessorBainbridge.com, a blog that focuses on law and business, but also discusses politics, religion, culture, and wine and food.

He is a member of the Federalist Society. He has been critical of President George W. Bush's handling of economic and foreign policy issues.

Bainbridge had donated consistently to Republican political candidates including a donation of $2,700 (the maximum allowed by law) to Donald Trump, but in 2020 he donated to the American Solidarity Party as well. He has since joined the American Solidarity Party.

Director primacy
Director primacy is a theory of the firm that was introduced by Bainbridge in an article in Northwestern University Law Review in 2003 (Vol 97 No 2). He argues that traditional firm theory is based on a false premise that the board's authority derives from the owners. He argues that while the board is appointed by the owners, the nature of the appointment is one in which the power to be exercised is not under the control of the appointing members. Once appointed then, directors are almost unfettered in their exercise of their powers. However, they are subject to overarching fiduciary responsibility which aligns their required actions with a shareholder wealth maximization principle.

References

External links
Bainbridge's blog hub site
Bainbridge's scholarship depository
A website for users of Bainbridge's Business Associations text
Bainbridge Biography UCLA
Bainbridge links on the web

1958 births
Living people
American alternative journalists
American bloggers
American legal scholars
Federalist Society members
Western Maryland College alumni
UCLA School of Law faculty
University of Virginia alumni
University of Virginia School of Law alumni
People from Doylestown, Pennsylvania
21st-century American non-fiction writers